Act.IL (also Act-IL) is a social networking service used by supporters of Israel to oppose online "anti-Israel content" such as the boycott, divestment and sanctions movement (BDS). Its activities have been referred to as "an online propaganda campaign."  

Act.IL directs its users to "missions" to like, comment on, and share pro-Israel material on social media. It also asks users to flag, report, and respond to criticism of Israel. Users are guided on how to respond, which might entail writing a reply using the provided talking points, or sharing or upvoting an allied comment. The app also provides users with ready-made memes promoting Israel's perspective for them to share. By completing missions users earn points, unlock badges, and have their scores displayed on leaderboards.

Act-IL is a joint project of the private Israeli university IDC Herzliya and the US-based Israeli-American Council. The Maccabee Task Force, one of Sheldon Adelson's foundations, is a major funder of Act.IL. The organization behind Act.IL is staffed by former intelligence officers and has a collegial relationship with the Israeli Intelligence Community. It has a close relationship with Israel's Ministry of Strategic Affairs which combats the BDS movement which it views as a threat.

According to Mondoweiss, an email sent in March of 2022 to the app's users announced that the app will be shut down but that users should continue to interact with Act.IL's content on its other social media platforms.

See also

References 

Mobile social software
Non-governmental organizations involved in the Israeli–Palestinian conflict
Propaganda in Israel
Internet manipulation and propaganda
2017 software